A science magazine is a periodical publication with news, opinions, and reports about science, generally written for a non-expert audience. In contrast, a periodical publication, usually including primary research and/or reviews, that is written by scientific experts is called a "scientific journal". Science magazines are read by non-scientists and scientists who want accessible information on fields outside their specialization.

Articles in science magazines are sometimes republished or summarized by the general press.

Examples of general science magazines

Australia 
 Australasian Science
 Australian Geographic
 Cosmos
 New Scientist

Austria 
 Universum

Bangladesh 
 Byapon - Youth Science Magazine in Bengali
 Bigganchinta
 ব্যাঙাচি।

Brazil 
 Galileu
 Superinteressante
 Ciência Hoje

Bulgaria 
 Da znaem poveche

Chile 
 Argo Navis

Czech Republic 
 Vesmír

Denmark 
 Aktuel Naturvidenskab
 Illustreret Videnskab

Europe 
 EuroScientist

Finland 
 Tiede

France 
 La Recherche
 Pour la Science
 Science & Vie

Germany 

 Laborjournal
 Spektrum der Wissenschaft
 Welt der Physik
 Science Notes

India 
 Resonance, published by Indian Academy of Sciences
 Current Science
 Dream 2047, published by Vigyan Prasar
 Jnan o Bijnan, published by Bangiya Bijnan Parishad
 Sandarbh
 Science Reporter
 Safari

Italy 
 Popular Science Italia
 Airone
 Focus
 Le Scienze

Japan 
 Newton press
 Nikkei Science

Netherlands 
 Quest
 Zenit

Pakistan 
 Global Science

Poland 
 Wiedza i Życie

Russia 
 Nauka i Zhizn
 Tekhnika Molodezhi
 Kvant
 Vokrug sveta

Serbia 
 SciTech

South Korea 
 Donga Science

Sweden 
 Illustrerad Vetenskap

Turkey 
 Bilim ve Teknik

United Kingdom 
 All About Space
 BBC Focus
 BBC Science Focus
 BBC Sky at Night
 Laboratory News
 New Scientist
 Physics World
 Scientific European

United States

General 
 American Scientist
 Discover
 MIT Technology Review
 Popular Mechanics
 Knowable Magazine
 Popular Science
 Nautilus

 New Scientist
 Quanta Magazine
 Science (1979–1986)
 Science News
 Scientific American
 Seed

Astronomy/Aerospace 
 Air & Space
 Astronomy
 Mercury
 Planetary Report
 Sky & Telescope
 Spinoff

Others 
 Physics Today
 Scientific American Mind
 The Scientist
 Skeptic
 Technologist
 Weatherwise

See also

 Popular science
 Science book
 Science journalism

References

 
Lists of magazines
Magazines

Magazines